The 1975 Southeast Asian Peninsular Games, officially known as the 8th Southeast Asian Peninsular Games, was a Southeast Asian multi-sport event held in Bangkok, Thailand from 9 to 16 December 1975. This was the third time Thailand hosted the games, and its first time since 1967. Previously, Thailand also hosted the 1959 inaugural games. South Vietnam, Cambodia and Laos, which only sent token squads made up of military personnel to previous games, declined to participate due to internal political problems. The games is the last games to bear the Southeast Asian Peninsular Games name, before it was renamed the Southeast Asian Games in the next edition of the games. The games was opened and closed by Bhumibol Adulyadej, the King of Thailand at the Suphalachasai Stadium. The final medal tally was led by Thailand, followed by host Singapore, Burma and Malaysia.

The games

Participating nations
 
 
 
  (Host)

Sports

Medal table

Key
 Host nation (Thailand)

References

External links
 History of the SEA Games
 https://web.archive.org/web/20011207141223/http://www.kl2001.com/index.html
 https://web.archive.org/web/19980111005738/http://seagames.wasantara.net.id/medali59-95/medals.htm
 https://web.archive.org/web/20081011071000/http://www.newsviews.info/sport09.html#sources
 https://web.archive.org/web/20091204132925/http://www.laoseagames2009.com/v1/seagamesxseapxstat.aspx
 https://web.archive.org/web/20170906223449/http://www.ocasia.org/game/MWinner.aspx?CntbEpEabMSOtPxlCplT5vIeXT1sBvVt

 
Southeast Asian Peninsular Games
Southeast Asian Peninsular Games
Southeast Asian Peninsular Games
Southeast Asian Peninsular Games
Southeast Asian Games in Thailand
Southeast Asian Games by year
Southeast Asian Peninsular Games